The 2017 Phillips 66 Big 12 men's basketball tournament was a postseason men's basketball tournament for the Big 12 Conference. It was played from March 8 to 11, in Kansas City, Missouri at the Sprint Center. Iowa State received the conference's automatic bid to the 2017 NCAA tournament with an 80–74 win over West Virginia in the finals.

Seeding
The Tournament consisted of a 10 team single-elimination tournament with the top 6 seeds receiving a bye.
Teams have been seeded by record within the conference, with a tiebreaker system used to seed teams with identical conference records.

Schedule
Game times for games 2, 4, 6, and 8 are subject to change because the second game of each session begins 30 minutes after the conclusion of the first game.

Bracket

Game summaries

First round

Quarterfinals

Semifinals

Championship

All-Tournament Team
Most Outstanding Player – Monte Morris, Iowa State

See also
2017 Big 12 Conference women's basketball tournament
2017 NCAA Division I men's basketball tournament
2016–17 NCAA Division I men's basketball rankings

References

External links
Official 2017 Big 12 Men's Basketball Tournament Bracket
 

Tournament
Big 12 men's basketball tournament
Big 12 men's basketball tournament
Big 12 men's basketball tournament
College sports tournaments in Missouri